Muthazhagu is a 2021 Indian-Tamil language soap opera starring Aashish Chakravarthi, Vaishali Thaniga and Shobana The main plot of the story is taken from Star Maa's Telugu serial Devatha. The show was premiered on 15 November 2021, and airs on Star Vijay and is also available on the digital platform Disney+ Hotstar.

Plot
It is a story of a young village girl named Muthzhagu who is quite dynamic, though poor. She lives in a neighborhood with her father, stepmother, and siblings. Notwithstanding her current situation, she strives to make her family feel comfortable, sacrificed, and content with her own desires. Bhoominathan, a wealthy young man, meets Muthazhagu. Muthazhagu is genuinely liked and valued by Bhoominathan's mother. She wishes to assist Muthazhagu and has been through a lot in her life. Muthazhagu and Bhoominathan's lifestyles and goals are incompatible.

Despite their disagreements, the young couple marries. Now the following story takes a twist where Anjali, his ex-lover from college and comes and marries her.

Cast

Main
 Shobaana as Muthuazhagu Boominathan – Bhoominathan's 2nd wife (2021–present); She is poor.
  Vaishali Taniga as Anjali Bhoominathan – Bhoominathan's lover and 1st wife (2021–present); She is rich, adamant, very eager to separate Muthazhagu for Bhoominathan's life and to throw him out of the family.
 Aashish Chakravarthi as Bhoominathan – Pechiammal's son; Husband of Anjali & Muthuzhagu (2021–present);
 Lakshmi Vasudevan as Pechiammal Veeramuthu: Veeramuthu's 1st wife/Bhoominathan's mother (2021–present); She is selfish and adamant.

Recurring 
 Shalini Rajan as Thamizh – Pechiammal's daughter/ Bhoominathan's younger sister/ Maruthu's wife. She is ambitious, genuine and rich girl.
 Surjith Ansary as Maruthu – Muthazhagu's half brother/ Thamizh's husband. He has feelings of love to Thamizh. He is ambitious, calm and poor boy; He works a part-time job at a mechanical shop.
 Deepa Nethran as Sornam – Bhoominathan's elderly maternal aunt/Senthil's mother
 Anand Babu as Veeramuthu – Bhoominathan's father; He hated Muthazhagu and his family because she is poor.
 Rajmohan as Sivanesan
 Rekha Suresh as Pandiammal – Sivanesan's wife; She hated Muthazhagu for being poor and is waiting for a chance to separate Muthazhagu and throw him out of the house.
 Shanthi as Thilaga – Muthazhagu's step-mother/Maruthu and Thangam's mother; She is greedy.
 Dhakshana as Thangam – Muthazhagu's step-sister
 Ganesh as Malaisaamy – Muthazhagu's father
 Mahesh Subramaniam as Amudhan – Shenbagam's ex love interest/Bhoominathan's younger brother/Sweetha's husband
 Sailu Imran as Shenbagam – Sivanesan's daughter/Amudhan's ex love interest/Senthil's wife
 KPY Sarath as Sodakku – Bhoominathan's friend
 Samyuthaa as Sweetha - Amudhan's wife
 Karthik Sriram as Senthil - Sornam's son/Shenbagam's husband
 Unknown as Vimal- Pandiammal's and Sivanesan's son; He tries to marry Tamizh, but he fails. Now he takes revenge Muthazhagu, Bhoominathan, Tamizh and Maruthu

Production
Newcomer Aashish Chakravarthi, winner of Mr. Chennai International 2019 selected to play a male lead who made his television debut in Suryavamsam (2020-2021) in Zee Tamil, Shobhana was chosen to play the role of Muthazhagu by making her debut. Lakshmi Vasudevan was chosen as Bommi's mother character.

Adaptations

References

External links 
 Muthazhagu serial on Hotstar

Star Vijay original programming
2021 Tamil-language television series debuts
Tamil-language television soap operas
Television shows set in Tamil Nadu
Tamil-language television series based on Telugu-language television series